The U.S. Highways in Arkansas are the U.S. Routes maintained by the U.S. state of Arkansas. There are 20 such highways.

Mainline highways

Suffixed and special routes
U.S. Highways in Arkansas sometimes have spur or business routes. The signs feature a "B" if designating a business route.

See also

References

 
U.S.